Charles Rodius (1802 – 9 April 1860) was a German-born artist, printmaker and architect. Trained in France before moving to England, he was transported as a convict to the Australian penal colony of New South Wales for theft in 1829.

While not as well known as other convict artists, such as Joseph Lycett and Thomas Griffiths Wainewright, Rodius has received praise for his works, and he is represented in several major Australian galleries.

Early life and education
Rodius was born in 1802 in Cologne, Germany. As a teenager he moved to Paris, France, where he studied art and worked as a teacher of "music, painting, drawing and languages in families of the first distinction".

In early 1829, while living in London, England, he was charged with stealing a perfume bottle, tickets, an opera glass and a handkerchief from a woman's purse. Rodius defended himself, arguing that the items were gifts from some of his female students. He was nonetheless convicted and sentenced to seven years' transportation to the Australian penal colony of New South Wales. At the time of his trial, he was described as "a young foreigner, dressed in a most fashionable style".

Transportation to Australia

Rodius arrived in New South Wales aboard the convict ship Sarah in December 1829. Like Thomas Bock, Joseph Lycett, and other transported convicts with artistic abilities, Rodius's skills as a draughtsman were utilised by the colonial authorities and he was assigned to the Department of Public Works in Sydney. He taught drawing to civil and military officers and helped to devise plans for proposed colonial buildings. Rodius was also commissioned as a portraitist by members of the colony's elite, such as Chief Justice Francis Forbes. Having established himself as an artist with the reputation of a dandy, Rodius, with the support of his patronage, was granted a ticket of exemption in 1832—the year he began to earn his own living as an artist—which was changed to a ticket of leave two years later.

Rodius remained in Australia where he continued to create portraits of well-known colonial identities, including explorer and fellow German Ludwig Leichhardt. According to National Portrait Gallery curator Joanna Gilmour, it was Rodius's portraits of Indigenous Australians that "demonstrated his true dexterity" as an artist. While some of the images hint at caricature, others, such as his images of Aborigines from the Shoalhaven district, "are disarming in their softness and sensitivity". Rodius's Aboriginal works were widely disseminated by the artist as lithographs, sold at a price intended to "place these interesting copies within the reach of all classes".

Rodius suffered a stroke in the late 1850s, leaving him paralysed on one side, and on 9 April 1860 he died "of infirmity" at Sydney's Liverpool Hospital.

See also
List of convicts transported to Australia
Australian art

References

External links

Gray, Jocelyn (1967). "Charles Rodius". Australian Dictionary of Biography.

1802 births
1860 deaths
19th-century English painters
English male painters
19th-century Australian artists
Australian people of English descent
Australian people of German descent
Convicts transported to Australia
19th-century English male artists
Australian landscape painters